Cephaloleia rubra is a species of rolled-leaf beetle in the family Chrysomelidae, first found in Trinidad.

References

Further reading

Staines, C. L. "0030. A new species of Cephaloleia Chevrolat, 1837 (Coleoptera: Chrysomelidae: Cassidinae) from Dominica." Insecta Mundi2008.0028-0030 (2008): 1–4.
Staines, Charles L., and Carlos García-Robledo. "The genus Cephaloleia Chevrolat, 1836 (Coleoptera, Chrysomelidae, Cassidinae)." ZooKeys 436 (2014): 1.

External links

Cassidinae
Insects of Trinidad and Tobago